Sir Eardley Lancelot Holland (October 29, 1879 – July 21, 1967) FRCS, FRCP, FRCOG was a British surgeon and foundation fellow of the Royal College of Obstetricians and Gynaecologists. In 1943, he became the fifth president of the college.

Education and Early Career
Holland graduated with first-class honours in medicine in 1905. Two years later he became an M.D. and was awarded a gold medal for "midwifery and diseases of women." He spent time in Germany early in his career, with the distinguished gynaecologists Olhausen, Bumm, and Orth. Later on he was a respected vaginal surgeon, the result of this early German training, where vaginal surgery was much more common than in England. This coincided with a time when obstetricians were increasingly being seen as gynaecological surgeons. "To see him operate in a case of neglected third degree tear of the perineum was to witness surgery as its precise best."

Professional accomplishments
He was a temporary captain with the Royal Army Medical Corps during World War I during which time he was in command of No. 20 General Hospital.  

Holland was known as one of the most impressive members of his profession between the wars. In 1923 a report he wrote into stillbirth was highly acclaimed by an author in the British Medical Journal. 

Between 1937-1940 he was advisor in obstetrics to the Ministry of Health and organised the evacuation of pregnant women out of London at the start of World War II. In 1943 he became President of the Royal College of Gynaecologists and oversaw a report called A Report on a National Maternity Service, which was used as a model for that part of the NHS when it was set up after the war.

In 1949 Holland was President of the Twelfth British Congress of Obstetrics and Gynaecology. After the congress he suggested new techniques for enquiring into maternal deaths. The result was the Confidential Enquiry into Maternal Deaths in England and Wales in 1952. Senior obstetricians in each region were tasked with collecting data about each death due to pregnancy or childbirth. The data was discussed at the ministry and regular meetings of the senior obstetricians. The appointed doctors were also well-positioned to coordinate "family doctors, midwives and consultants in applying in their obstetric practice the lessons learned from the Enquiry." The results were exceptional. Maternal mortality fell "from 44 per 10 000 births in 1928 to 7 in 1952 and to 1-6…  in the years 1970-2." By 1976, the rate had fallen to less than 1 per 10 000 births.

Holland was known as an exceptionally hard-working doctor.

Holland was a prolific author, editor, and lecturer, and the recipient of many honors. He was knighted in 1946. He wrote the Manual of Obstetrics which ran to twelve editions and was used to teach innumerable students.

He was a founding Fellow of the Royal College of Obstetricians and Gynaecologists. As well as his hospital work and his private practice, he was a committed member of his profession.

Personal life
Holland was first married to Dorothy Colgate then to Olivia Constable. His obituary says he married Olivia "some years later" than Dorothy’s death.  In fact, it was four months after Dorothy died, on 13th February 1952, that Eardley married "quietly in London... Miss Olivia Constable… only daughter of the late Mr. and Mrs. L. L. Constable."

Personality
Holland was described by colleagues writing in response to his obituaries as "not immune to an irritable impatience" and "upright and grand, almost haughty". The food writer Patience Gray, who was Dorothy's niece, lived with the Holland's in London in 1930. She described him in her memoir:

However, other colleagues remembered him as "courteous and considerate". One of his collaborators on the textbook British Obstetric Practice said, he had "a genius for friendship, which was evident in all the gatherings of his colleagues, owing to his lively interest in their affairs and work and a capacity or real affection for his close friends."

Princess Charlotte
Holland was interested in Princess Charlotte who died in childbirth. He published a monograph about the causes of her death in 1951. Holland left a large collection of Charlottiana to Brighton Pavilion in his will. He wanted it to be displayed as the Eardley Holland Collection, but it mostly remains in storage. There was an exhibition involving much of it in 2012/13. He shared this interest in Princess Charlotte with the writer Elizabeth Jenkins. Jenkins and Holland had an affair. Two years after the affair ended, Jenkins sent Holland a glass portrait of the Princess, knowing he was a collector. The princess appears in Jenkins' 1968 novel Honey on a tea tray which reads: "England mourns her Princess."

References

1879 births
1967 deaths
Fellows of the Royal College of Obstetricians and Gynaecologists
20th-century British medical doctors
British obstetricians
British surgeons
Fellows of the Royal College of Surgeons
Fellows of the Royal College of Physicians
Royal Army Medical Corps officers
British Army personnel of World War I
20th-century surgeons